A Coulter counter is an apparatus for counting and sizing particles suspended in electrolytes. The Coulter counter is the commercial term for the technique known as resistive pulse sensing or electrical zone sensing. The apparatus is based on the Coulter principle named after its inventor, Wallace H. Coulter. 

A typical Coulter counter has one or more microchannels that separate two chambers containing electrolyte solutions. As fluid that contains particles or cells is drawn through the microchannels, each particle causes a brief change to the electrical resistance of the liquid. The counter detects these changes in the electrical resistance.

Coulter principle
The Coulter principle states that particles pulled through an orifice, concurrent with an electric current, produce a change in impedance that is proportional to the volume of the particle traversing the orifice. This pulse in impedance originates from the displacement of electrolyte caused by the particle. The principle has found commercial success in the medical industry, particularly in hematology, where it can be applied to count and size the various cells that make up whole blood.

Cells, being poorly conductive particles, alter the effective cross-section of the conductive microchannel. If these particles are less conductive than the surrounding liquid medium, the electrical resistance across the channel increases, causing the electric current passing across the channel to briefly decrease. By monitoring such pulses in electric current, the number of particles for a given volume of fluid can be counted. The size of the electric current change is related to the size of the particle, enabling a particle size distribution to be measured, which can be correlated to mobility, surface charge, and concentration of the particles.

The Coulter counter is a vital constituent of today's hospital laboratory. Its primary function is the quick and accurate analysis of complete blood counts (often referred to as CBC). The CBC is used to determine the number or proportion of white and red blood cells in the body. Previously, this procedure involved preparing a peripheral blood smear and manually counting each type of cell under a microscope, a process that typically took a half-hour.

Coulter counters have a wide variety of applications including paint, ceramics, glass, molten metals, and food manufacturing. They are also routinely employed for quality control.

A Coulter counter played an important role in the development of the first ever cell sorter, and was involved in the early days of the development of flow cytometry. Even today, some flow cytometers utilize the Coulter principle to provide highly accurate information about cell size and count.

Many investigators have designed a variety of devices based on the Coulter principle, and generated peer-reviewed publications featuring data from these devices. A few of these devices have also been commercialized. All implementations of the Coulter principle feature trade offs between sensitivity, noise shielding, solvent compatibility, speed of measurement, sample volume, dynamic range, and reliability of device manufacture.

Development 

Wallace H. Coulter discovered the Coulter principle in the late 1940s, though a patent was not awarded until October 20, 1953. Coulter was influenced by the atomic bombs dropped on Hiroshima and Nagasaki.  These events motivated Coulter to simplify and improve blood cell analysis so that large populations could be screened rapidly, as would be necessary in the event of a nuclear war. Partial funding of the project came from a grant award from the Office of Naval Research.

Coulter was awarded US Patent #2,656,508, Means for Counting Particles Suspended in a Fluid. The Coulter principle is most commonly employed in a Coulter counter, which is an analytical instrument designed for a specific task such as counting cells. However, there are numerous other ways to implement the Coulter principle. Several of these have been attempted, some with commercial success, and some purely for academic research. To date, the most commercially successful application of the Coulter principle is in hematology, where it is used to obtain information about patients' blood cells.

The Coulter principle relies on the fact that particles moving in an electric field cause measurable disturbances in that field. The magnitudes of these disturbances are proportional to the size of the particles in the field. Coulter identified several requirements necessary for practical application of this phenomenon. First, the particles must be suspended in a conducting liquid. Next, the electrical field must be physically constricted so that the movement of particles in the field causes detectable changes in the current. Finally, the particles must be dilute enough so that only one at a time passes through the physical constriction, preventing an artifact known as coincidence.

While the Coulter principle can be implemented in a variety of designs, there are two that have become the most commercially relevant. These include an aperture format and a flow cell format. The figure above shows several other geometries that Coulter patented.

Aperture format 
The aperture format is used in most commercial Coulter counters. In this setup, a hole of defined size is created in a jewel disk (made of the same material as jewel bearings in watches) using special manufacturing processes. The resulting aperture is then embedded in the wall of a glass tube, creating what is commonly referred to as an aperture tube. While in use, the aperture tube is placed in a liquid so that the jewel disk is completely submerged and the tube can fill with liquid. Electrodes are positioned both inside and outside the aperture tube, which allows current to flow through the aperture. A pump is used to create a vacuum at the top of the tube, which draws the liquid through the aperture. Samples to be analyzed are then slowly added to the conducting liquid surrounding the aperture tube. At the start of the experiment, the electric field is turned on and the pump begins to draw the dilute suspension through the aperture. The resulting data are collected by recording the electrical pulses generated as the particles traverse the aperture.

While the basic physical setup of the aperture format is consistent in every Coulter counter, the amount and quality of data varies greatly as a function of the signal processing circuitry implemented. For example, amplifiers with lower noise thresholds and greater dynamic range can increase the sensitivity of the system. Similarly, digital pulse height analyzers with variable bin widths provide much higher resolution data as opposed to analog analyzers with fixed bins. Further, combining a Coulter counter with a digital computer allows capture of many electrical pulse characteristics, while analog counters typically store a much more limited amount of information about each pulse.

Flow cell format 
The flow cell format is most commonly implemented in hematology instruments, and sometimes flow cytometers. In this format, electrodes are embedded at either end of a flow channel and the electric field is applied through the channel. This format has several advantages as opposed to the aperture format. This arrangement allows for continuous sample analysis whereas the aperture format is single-batch format. Further, the use of a flow cell lends itself to addition of a sheath flow, which keeps particles centered in the middle of the flow channel. This allows measurements to be performed simultaneously, such as probing the object with a laser. The major disadvantages of the flow cell format are that it is much more expensive to manufacture and is typically fixed to one channel width, whereas the aperture format offers a wide variety of aperture sizes.

Microfluidic versions 
The Coulter principle has been applied to lab-on-a-chip approaches to particle detection, using microfluidics approaches that allow much smaller pores to be fabricated than can easily be achieved using the bulk methods used to fabricate traditional Coulter counters. These approaches, known by the generic phrase microfluidic resistive pulse sensing, have allowed the extension of the Coulter principle to the deep sub-micron range, allowing, for example, the direct detection of virus particles in fluid.

Experimental considerations

Coincidence 
Anomalous electrical pulses can be generated if the concentration of sample is so high that multiple particles enter the aperture simultaneously. This situation is known as coincidence. This occurs because there is no way to ensure that a single large pulse is the result of a single large particle or multiple small particles entering the aperture at once. To prevent this situation, samples must be fairly dilute.

Particle path 
The shape of the generated electrical pulse varies with the particle path through the aperture. Shoulders and other artifacts can occur because the electric field density varies across the diameter of the aperture. This variance is a result of both the physical constriction of the electric field and also the fact that the liquid velocity varies as a function of radial location in the aperture. In the flow cell format, this effect is minimized since sheath flow ensures each particle travels an almost identical path through the flow cell. In the aperture format, signal processing algorithms can be used to correct for artifacts resulting from particle path.

Conductive particles 
Conductive particles are a common concern for individuals considering the Coulter principle. While this topic raises some scientific questions, practically, it rarely affects the results of an experiment. This is because the conductivity difference between most conductive materials and ions in liquid (referred to as the discharge potential) is so great that most conductive materials act as insulators in a Coulter counter. The voltage necessary to break down this potential barrier is referred to as the breakdown voltage. For those highly conductive materials that present a problem, the voltage used during a Coulter experiment should be reduced below the breakdown potential (which can be determined empirically).

Porous particles 
The Coulter principle measures the volume of an object, since the disturbance in the electric field is proportional to the volume of electrolyte displaced from the aperture. This leads to some confusion amongst those who are used to optical measurements from microscopes or other systems that only view two dimensions and also show the boundaries of an object. The Coulter principle, on the other hand, measures three dimensions and the volume displaced by an object. It is most useful to think of sponges; even though a wet sponge may appear very large, it will displace significantly less liquid than a solid brick of the same dimensions.

Direct current and alternating current 
The Coulter counter as invented by Wallace Coulter applies a direct current (DC) in order to count particles (cells), and produces electrical pulses of amplitude dependent on the size of cells. The cells can be modeled as electrical insulators surrounded by a conductive liquid which block a portion of the electrical path thus increasing the measured resistance momentarily. This is the most common measuring system using the Coulter principle.

Subsequent inventions were able to extend the information obtained by using alternating current (AC) in order to probe the complex electrical impedance of the cells rather than just their size. The cell may then be approximately modeled as an insulating cell membrane surrounding the cell's cytoplasm, which is conductive. The thinness of the cell membrane creates an electrical capacitance between the cytoplasm and the electrolyte surrounding the cell. The electrical impedance may then be measured at one or another AC frequency. At low frequencies (well below 1 MHz) the impedance is similar to the DC resistance. However, higher frequencies in the MHz range, probe the thickness of the cell membrane (which determines its capacitance). At much higher frequencies (well above 10 MHz) however, the impedance of the membrane capacitance drops to the point where the larger contribution to the measured impedance is from the cytoplasm itself (the membrane is essentially "shorted out"). Using different frequencies the apparatus thus becomes much more than a counter of cells, also being sensitive to the internal structure and composition of the cells.

Major applications

Hematology 
The most successful and important application of the Coulter principle is in the characterization of human blood cells. The technique has been used to diagnose a variety of diseases and is the standard method for obtaining red blood cell counts (RBCs) and white blood cell counts (WBCs) as well as several other common parameters. When combined with other technologies such as fluorescence tagging and light scattering, the Coulter principle can help produce a detailed profile of patients' blood cells.

Cell count and size 
In addition to clinical counting of blood cells (cell diameters usually 6–10 micrometers), the Coulter principle has established itself as the most reliable laboratory method for counting a wide variety of cells, ranging from bacteria (<1 micrometer in size), fat cells (about 400 micrometers), plant cell aggregates (>1200 micrometers), and stem cell embryoid bodies (around 900 micrometers).

Particle characterization 
The Coulter principle has proved useful for applications well beyond cellular studies. The fact that it individually measures particles, is independent of any optical properties, is extremely sensitive, and is very reproducible has appeal to a wide variety of fields. Consequently, the Coulter principle has been adapted to the nanoscale to produce nanoparticle characterization techniques known as microfluidic resistive pulse sensing as well as one commercial venture which sells a technique it terms tunable resistive pulse sensing or TRPS. TRPS enables high-fidelity analysis of a diverse set of nanoparticles, including functionalized drug delivery nanoparticles, virus-like particles (VLPs), liposomes, exosomes, polymeric nanoparticles, and microbubbles.

See also
Hemocytometer
Flow cytometry
Hematology analyzer

References

External links

https://web.archive.org/web/20080424022037/http://web.mit.edu/invent/iow/coulter.html
, October 20, 1953, Wallace H. Coulter
"Dynamically resizable nanometre-scale apertures for molecular sensing"; Stephen J. Sowerby, Murray F. Broom, George B. Petersen; Sensors and Actuators B: Chemical Volume 123, Issue 1 (2007), pages 325–330

Cell culture techniques
Counting instruments
Laboratory equipment